Eileen Smith (1917–2002) was an international lawn bowls competitor for England.

Bowls career
In 1973 she won a silver medal in the fours with Phyllis Derrick, Nancie Colling and Joan Sparkes at the 1973 World Outdoor Bowls Championship in Wellington, New Zealand, and also earned a bronze medal in the team event (Taylor Trophy).

References

English female bowls players
1917 births
2002 deaths